Tapasya Nayak  is an Indian television actress. She is known for appearing in the television serial Chakravartin Ashoka Samrat as Ahankara's mother Queen Nihaarika.  She has worked in many other serials of Sony SAB such as Taarak Mehta Ka Ooltah Chashmah, Chidiya Ghar  and Pritam Pyare Aur Woh.

Television